François Bourgoing (1585 – 1662) was a Superior general of the Oratory of Jesus.  He succeeded Charles de Condren. He was a follower of Pierre de Bérulle.

References

French Oratory
17th-century French Roman Catholic priests
Clergy from Paris
1585 births
1662 deaths